Ena Taslidža (born 14 August 2001) is a footballer who plays as a forward for American collegiate team Miami Hurricanes. Born in Germany, she represents Bosnia and Herzegovina at international level.

Career
Taslidža has been capped for the Bosnia and Herzegovina national team, appearing for the team during the 2019 FIFA Women's World Cup qualifying cycle.

References

External links
 
 

2001 births
Living people
Citizens of Bosnia and Herzegovina through descent
Bosnia and Herzegovina women's footballers
Women's association football forwards
Miami Hurricanes women's soccer players
Bosnia and Herzegovina women's international footballers
Bosnia and Herzegovina expatriate women's footballers
Bosnia and Herzegovina expatriate sportspeople in the United States
Expatriate women's soccer players in the United States
Sportspeople from Darmstadt
Footballers from Hesse
German women's footballers
1. FFC Frankfurt players
German expatriate women's footballers
German expatriate sportspeople in the United States
German people of Bosnia and Herzegovina descent
1. FFC 08 Niederkirchen players